The Cassutt Special is a single-seat sport and racing aircraft designed in the United States in 1951 for Formula One air races. Plans are still available for homebuilding. Designed by ex-TWA captain Tom Cassutt, it is a mid-wing cantilever monoplane with fixed tailwheel undercarriage. The fuselage and tail are of fabric-covered steel tube construction, and the wings are built from plywood over wooden ribs. An updated taper-wing design was first flown in 1971 on Jim Wilson's "Plum Crazy".

Plans and parts are available from Creighton King of Salt Lake City, Utah, United States, for amateur construction. King also offers plans for the Stockbarger tapered wood wing.

Design and development
The aircraft is built with a 4130 tubular steel spaceframe fuselage and a plywood-skinned wing with solid spruce spar and built-up ribs. The design lends itself well to modification, there being several different wing options of wood or composite construction. Several different tails have been built, including T-tails. 

The standard engine used for competition is the  Continental O-200, while other, lower-powered engines can be used for recreational flying, including the other small Continental A65 and Continental C90. Cassutt Aircraft discourages the use of auto conversions or larger Lycoming engines. Lycoming’s have been successful in several builds but the increased weight rarely gives the desired performance boost.

Operational history
1958 - Tom Cassutt flies his Cassutt to win the National Championship Midget Air Races at Ft. Wayne, Indiana.

Variants
Cassutt I
Developed in 1951, First race at Dansville, New York in 1954. 
Cassutt II 
Casutt IIM
 wingspan
Cassutt IIIM
 wingspan
Cassutt IIIM Sport 
 wingspan

Specifications (Cassutt III racer)

See also

References

 
 Manufacturer's website
 Owners's Forum

1950s United States sport aircraft
Special
Single-engined tractor aircraft
Homebuilt aircraft
Racing aircraft
Mid-wing aircraft
Aircraft first flown in 1954